In the jurisprudence of the canon law of the Catholic Church, a dispensation is the exemption from the immediate obligation of law in certain cases. Its object is to modify the hardship often arising from the rigorous application of general laws to particular cases, and its essence is to preserve the law by suspending its operation in such cases.

Concept
Since laws aimed at the good of the entire community may not be suitable for certain cases or persons, the legislator has the right (sometimes even the duty) to dispense from the law.

Dispensation is not a permanent power or a special right as in privilege. If the reason for the dispensation ceases entirely, then the dispensation also ceases entirely. If the immediate basis for the right is withdrawn, then the right ceases.

Validity, legality, "just and reasonable cause"
There must be a "just and reasonable cause" for granting a dispensation. The judgement regarding what is "just and reasonable" is made based upon the particular situation and the importance of the law to be dispensed from. If the cause is not "just and reasonable" then the dispensation is illegal and, if issued by someone other than the lawgiver of the law in question or his superior, it is also invalid. If it is uncertain as to whether a sufficiently "just and reasonable cause" exists, the dispensation is both legal and valid.

History
In canonical legal theory, the dispensing power is the corollary of the legislative. The dispensing power, like the legislative, was formerly invested in general councils and even in provincial synods. But in the West, with the gradual centralisation of authority in the Roman curia, it became ultimately vested in the pope as the supreme lawgiver of the Catholic Church.

Despite frequent crises in the diplomatic relations between the Holy See and temporal governments in the later Middle Ages, the authority of the papacy as the dispenser of grace and spiritual licences remained largely unchallenged. In the early thirteenth century, Pope Innocent III (1198–1216) fostered the extension of papal political power. He emphasised, "as had no pope before him, the pope's plenitudo potestatis ("fullness of power") within the Church." Since the Church comprised the whole of mankind, medieval jurists were accustomed to what we might call shared sovereignty, and freely accepted that the pope had a concurrent jurisdiction with temporal sovereigns.  The temporal princes could administer their own laws, but the princes of the Church, and especially the pope, administered the canon law (so far as it was subject to merely human control).

In the decretal Proposuit, Innocent III proclaimed that the pope could, if circumstances demanded, dispense from canon law, de jure, with his plenitude of power.  He based his view on princeps legibus solutus est ("the prince is not bound by the laws").  Because the pope was above the law, time or precedent did not limit his power, and he could dispense with any law.

Such a dispensation was not, strictly speaking, legislative, but rather a judicial, quasi-judicial, or executive act. It was also, of course, subject to the proviso that his jurisdiction to dispense with laws was limited to those laws which were within his jurisdiction or competence.  "[T]his principle would have been a commonplace to anyone who had studied in Bologna."

By this power of dispensation, the pope could release clergy and laity from the obligations of the canon law in all cases that were not contrary to ius divinum and even in a few cases that were.  This power was most frequently invoked to enable laity to marry notwithstanding impediments of affinity or kinship, and to enable persons labouring under an irregularity (such as of bastardy, servitude, or lack of age) to take orders or become regulars.

Dispensations awarded was classified into three categories:
The first two categories, rules concerning the procedure of taking Holy Orders, and dispensations concerning tenure of benefices, applied only to clergy, and of release from religious vows for members of Catholic religious orders.
The third category, matrimonial dispensations, i.e. regarding marriage, concerned only the laity since the clergy is celibate.
Beside the three main classes of dispensation, the Roman Curia was ready to grant miscellaneous positive concessions to applicants, from individuals to larger organisations, although the former is rare. This host of dispensations, faculties, and indults included permission to eat flesh during Lent, the celebration of offices in chapels of ease and private oratories, and the granting of academic degrees.  Those dispensations relating to academic degrees were mostly issued under the sanction of the canon law, as stated in the constitution of Pope Boniface VIII beginning Cum ex eo.

Contemporary use
As of the early part of the twentieth century, the actual practice of the Roman Catholic Church is based upon the decisions of the Council of Trent, which left the medieval theory intact while endeavouring to guard against its abuses. The proposal put forward by the Gallican and Spanish bishops to subordinate the papal power of dispensation to the consent of the Church in general council was rejected, and even the canons of the council of Trent itself, in so far as they affected reformation of morals or ecclesiastical discipline, were decreed “saving the authority of the Holy See” (Sess. xxv. cap. 21, de ref.). At the same time it was laid down in respect of all dispensations, whether papal or other, that they were to be granted only for just and urgent causes, or in view of some decided benefit to the Church (urgens justaque causa et major quandoque utilitas), and in all cases gratis. The payment of money for a dispensation was ipso facto to make the dispensation void (Sess. xxv. cap. 18, de ref.).

There are several levels of authority in the Church that are competent to dispense the various demands of Canon Law.  Local ordinaries, for example, are competent to dispense the various canonical impediments to the sacrament of marriage. Pastors may grant individuals dispensation from the Sunday obligation (to attend the Mass, or from the obligation of Sunday rest from servile labour) upon request, for good cause, whereas diocesan bishops may grant blanket dispensations for everybody in their territory, as all the bishops of the United States did in late March 2020 in response to a coronavirus pandemic.  Some dispensations are reserved to the Holy See, for example, from the impediment to ordination of apostasy.

The power of dispensing lies with the original lawgiver, with his successors or with his superiors, and with those persons to whom they have delegated this right. Since there is no superior above the pope, he can therefore dispense from all canonical laws: universal laws introduced by himself, his predecessors or general councils, and particular laws enacted by plenary and provincial councils, bishops and similar prelates. As a general rule the pope delegates his powers to the various congregations of the Roman Curia which are charged with granting dispensations in matters within the sphere of their competence.

Papal dispensation

Papal dispensation is a reserved right of the pope that allows for individuals to be exempted from a specific Canon law. Dispensations are divided into two categories: general, and matrimonial. Matrimonial dispensations can be either to allow a marriage in the first place, or to dissolve one. The authority for the pope to exempt an individual or situation from a law stems from his position as the Vicar of Christ, which implies divine authority and knowledge as well as jurisdiction.

The first marriage of Henry VIII of England to Catherine of Aragon required a papal dispensation as it breached canon law on Affinity because she was the widow of Henry's elder brother Arthur, Prince of Wales. This was obtained successfully, but when he later wished to divorce her, he was unable to get another one, causing his break with Rome. Their daughter Mary Tudor, a fervent Catholic, would later apply for a secret dispensation absolving her of submitting to the basic rules of Protestant religion when pressured under the threat of death by her father.

In the earlier Middle Ages, especially the 11th to 12th centuries, the church had developed canon law on affinity and consanguinity (the first denoting a connection by marriage only, the second a genetic one) to cover very remote relationships, so that a very high proportion of marriages between the small and inter-related European elites needed expensive dispensations from either the Pope or a bishop. This was recognised as an abuse, and later the relationships covered were reduced. In 1059, the eleventh canon of the Council of Rome recognized the impediment of affinity as well as of consanguinity to extend to the seventh degree, the high point of the restrictions. Innocent III in the Fourth Council of the Lateran (1215) limited both affinity and consanguinity needing dispensation to the fourth degree, and the Council of Trent (Sess. XXIV, c. iv, De Ref.) in the 16th century limited the juridical effect of extra-matrimonial intercourse to the second degree of affinity.

Matrimonial dispensation
A matrimonial dispensation is the relaxation in a particular case of an impediment prohibiting or annulling a marriage. It may be granted: (a) in favour of a contemplated marriage or to legitimize one already contracted; (b) in secret cases, or in public cases, or in both; (c) in foro interno only, or in foro externo (the latter includes also the former). Power of dispensing in foro interno is not always restricted to secret cases (casus occulti).
These expressions are by no means identical.

The information in this section concerns Roman Catholic canon law in the early 20th century. The canon law in question was considerably changed by the 1917 Code of Canon Law and the 1983 Code of Canon Law and should not be considered to reflect the present situation.

General powers of dispensation

Pope and his Curia 
The Pope cannot dispense from impediments founded on Divine law — except, as above described, in the case of vows, espousals and non-consummated marriages, or valid and consummated marriage of neophytes before baptism. In doubtful cases, however, he may decide authoritatively as to the objective value of the doubt. In respect of impediments arising from ecclesiastical law the pope has full dispensing power. Every such dispensation granted by him is valid, and when he acts from a sufficient motive it is also licit.

He is not, however, out of consideration for the public welfare, to exercise this power personally, unless in very exceptional cases, where certain specific impediments are in question. Such cases are error, violence, Holy orders, disparity of worship, public conjugicide, consanguinity in the direct line or in the first degree (equal) of the collateral Line and the first degree of affinity (from lawful intercourse) in the direct line. As a rule the pope exercises his power of dispensation through the Roman Congregations and Tribunals.

Until around the 1900s, the Dataria was the most important channel for matrimonial dispensations when the impediment was public or about to become public within a short time. The Holy Office, however, had exclusive control in foro externo over all impediments connected with or juridically bearing on matters of faith, e. g. disparity of worship, mixta religio, Holy orders, etc. The dispensing power in foro interno lay with the Penitentiaria, and in the case of pauperes or quasi-pauperes this same Congregation had dispensing power over public impediments in foro externo. The Penitentiaria held as pauperes for all countries outside of Italy those whose united capital, productive of a fixed revenue, did not exceed 5370 lire (about 1050 dollars); and as quasi-pauperes, those whose capital did not exceed 9396 lire (about 1850 dollars). It likewise had the power of promulgating general indults affecting public impediments, as for instance the indult of 15 November 1907. Propaganda Fide was charged with all dispensations, both in foro inferno and in foro externo, for countries under its jurisdiction, as was the Congregation of Extraordinary Ecclesiastical Affairs for all countries depending on it, e. g. Russia, Latin America and certain apostolic vicariates and prefectures Apostolic.

On 3 November 1908, the duties of these various Congregations received important modifications in consequence of the Apostolic Constitution "Sapienti", in which Pope Pius X reorganized the Roman Curia. Dispensing power from public impediments in the case of pauperes or quasi-pauperes was transferred from the Dataria and the Penitentiaria to a newly established Roman Congregation known as the Congregatio de Disciplinâ Sacramentorum, the Penitentiaria retaining dispensing power over occult impediments in foro interno only. The Holy Office retained its faculties, but restricted expressly under three heads: (1) disparity of worship; (2) mixta religio; (3) the Pauline privilege.

Congregatio de Propaganda Fide remained the channel for securing dispensations for all countries under its jurisdiction, but being required for the sake of executive unity, to defer, in all matters concerning matrimony, to the various Congregations competent to act thereon, its function became that of intermediary. In America, the United States, Canada and Newfoundland, and in Europe, the British Isles were withdrawn from Propaganda, and placed under the common law of countries with a hierarchy. The Congregation of Extraordinary Ecclesiastical Affairs lost all its powers; consequently the countries hitherto subject to it must address themselves either to the Holy Office or to the Congregatio de Disciplinâ Sacramentorum according to the nature of the impediment.

The powers of any Congregation are suspended during the vacancy of the Holy See, except those of the Apostolic Penitentiary in the internal forum (in foro interno), which, during that time, are even increased. Though suspended, the powers of a Congregation may be used in cases of urgent necessity.

Diocesan bishops 
We shall treat first of their fixed perpetual faculties, whether ordinary or delegated, afterwards of their habitual and temporary faculties. By virtue of their ordinary power (Jurisdiction) bishops can dispense from those prohibent impediments of ecclesiastical law which are not reserved to the pope. The reserved impediments of this kind are espousals, the vow of perpetual chastity, and vows taken in diocesan religious institutes, mixta religio, public display and solemn blessing at marriages within forbidden times, the vetitum, or interdict laid on a marriage by the pope, or by the metropolitan in a case of appeal. The bishop may also dispense from diriment impediments after the following manner:

 By tacit consent of the Holy See he can dispense in foro interno from secret impediments from which the pope is wont to exercise his power of dispensing, in three cases: (a) in marriages already contracted and consummated, when urgent necessity arises (i. e. when the interested parties cannot be separated without scandal or endangering their souls, and there is no time to have recourse to the Holy See or to its delegate) — it is, however, necessary that such marriage shall have taken place in lawful form before the Church, and that one of the contracting parties at least shall have been ignorant of the impediment; (b) in marriages about to be contracted and which are called embarrassing (perplexi) cases, i. e. where everything being ready a delay would be defamatory or would cause scandal; (c) when there is a serious doubt of fact as to the existence of an impediment; in this case the dispensation seems to hold good, even though in course of time the impediment becomes certain, and even public. In cases where the law is doubtful no dispensation is necessary; but the bishop may, if he thinks proper, declare authentically the existence and sufficiency of such doubt.
 By virtue of a decree of the Congregation of the Inquisition or Holy Office (20 February 1888) diocesan bishops and other ordinaries (especially a Vicar Apostolic, administrator Apostolic and Prefect Apostolic, having jurisdiction over an allocated territory, also vicar-general in spiritualibus and a vicar capitular) may dispense in very urgent (gravissimum) danger of death from all diriment impediments (secret or public) of ecclesiastical law, except priesthood and affinity (from lawful intercourse) in the direct line. However, they can use this privilege only in favour of persons actually living in real concubinage or united by a merely civil marriage, and only when there is no time for recourse to the Holy See. They may also legitimize the children of such unions, except those born of adultery or sacrilege. In the decree of 1888 is also included the impediment of clandestinity. This decree permits therefore (at least until the Holy See shall have issued other instructions) to dispense, in the case of concubinage or civil marriage, with the presence of the priest and of the two witnesses required by the Decree "Ne temere" in urgent cases of marriage in extremis. Canonists do not agree as to whether bishops hold these faculties by virtue of their ordinary power or by general delegation of the law. It seems to us more probable that those just described under #1 belong to them as ordinaries, while those under #2 are delegated. They are, therefore, empowered to delegate the former; in order to subdelegate the latter they must be guided by the limits fixed by the decree of 1888 and its interpretation dated 9 June 1889. That is, if it is a question of habitual delegation parish priests only should receive it, and only for cases where there is no time for recourse to the bishop.

Besides the fixed perpetual faculties, bishops also receive from the Holy See habitual temporary indults for a certain period of time or for a limited number of cases. These faculties are granted by fixed "formulæ", in which the Holy See from time to time, or as occasion requires it, makes some slight modifications. These faculties call for a broad interpretation. Nevertheless, it is well to bear in mind, when interpreting them, the actual legislation of the Congregation whence they issue, so as not to extend their use beyond the places, persons, number of cases and impediments laid down in a given indult. Faculties thus delegated to a bishop do not in any way restrict his ordinary faculties; nor (in se) do the faculties issued by one Congregation affect those granted by another. When several specifically different impediments occur in the same case, and one of them exceeds the bishop's powers, he may not dispense from any of them.

Even when the bishop has faculties for each impediment taken separately he cannot (unless he possesses the faculty known as de cumulo) use his various faculties simultaneously in a case where, all the impediments being public, one of them exceeds his ordinary faculties, it is not necessary for a bishop to delegate his faculties to his vicars-general; since 1897 they were always granted to the bishop as ordinary, therefore to the vicar-general also. With regard to other priests a decree of the holy Office (14 December 1898) declared that for the future temporary faculties may be always subdelegated unless the indult expressly states the contrary. These faculties are valid from the date when they were granted in the Roman Curia. In actual practice they do not expire, as a rule, at the death of the pope nor of the bishop to whom they were given, but pass on to those who take his place (the vicar capitular, the administrator or succeeding bishop). Faculties granted for a fixed period of time, or a limited number of cases, cease when the period or number has been reached; but while awaiting their renewal the bishop, unless culpably negligent, may continue to use them provisionally. A bishop can use his habitual faculties only in favour of his own subjects. The matrimonial discipline of the Decree Ne temere (2 August 1907) contemplates as such all persons having a true canonical domicile, or continuously resident for one month within his territory, also vagi, or persons who have no domicile anywhere and can claim no continuous stay of one month. When a matrimonial impediment is common to both parties the bishop, in dispensing his own subject, dispenses also the other.

Vicars capitular and vicars-general 
A vicar capitular, or in his place a lawful administrator, enjoys all the dispensing powers possessed by the bishop in virtue of his ordinary jurisdiction or of delegation of the law; according to the actual discipline he enjoys even the habitual powers which had been granted the deceased bishop for a fixed period of time or for a limited number of cases, even if the indult should have been made out in the name of the Bishop of N. Considering the actual praxis of the Holy See, the same is true of particular indults (see below). The vicar-general has by virtue of his appointment all the ordinary powers of the bishop over prohibent impediments, but requires a special mandate to give him common-law faculties for diriment impediments. As for habitual temporary faculties, since they are now addressed to the ordinary, they belong also ipso facto to the vicar-general while he holds that office. He can also use particular indults when they are addressed to the ordinary, and when they are not so addressed the bishop can always subdelegate him, unless the contrary be expressly stated in the indult.

Parish priests and other ecclesiastics 
A parish priest by common law can dispense only from an interdict laid on a marriage by him or by his predecessor. Some canonists of note accord him authority to dispense from secret impediments in what are called embarrassing (perplexi) cases, i. e. when there is no time for recourse to the bishop, but with the obligation of subsequent recourse ad cautelam, i. e. for greater security; a similar authority is attributed by them to confessors. This opinion seems yet gravely probable, though the Penitentiaria continues to grant among its habitual faculties a special authority for such cases and restricts somewhat its use.

Particular indults of dispensation 
When there is occasion to procure a dispensation that exceeds the powers of the ordinary, or when there are special reasons for direct recourse to the Holy See, procedure is by way of supplica (petition) and private rescript. The supplica need not necessarily be drawn up by the petitioner, nor even at his instance; it does not, however, become valid until he accepts it. Although, since the Constitution "Sapienti", all the faithful may have direct recourse to the Roman Congregations, the supplica is usually forwarded through the ordinary (of the person's birthplace or domicile, or since the Decree "Ne temere" the residence of one of the petitioners), who transmits it to the proper Congregation either by letter or through his accredited agent; but if there is question of sacramental secrecy, it is sent directly to the Penitentiaria, or handed to the bishop's agent under a sealed cover for transmission to the Penitentiaria. The supplica ought to give the names (family and Christian) of the petitioners (except in secret cases forwarded to the Penitentiaria), the name of the Ordinary forwarding it, or the name of the priest to whom, in secret cases, the rescript must be sent; the age of the parties, especially in dispensations affecting consanguinity and affinity; their religion, at least when one of them is not a Catholic; the nature, degree and number of all impediments (if recourse is had to the Congregatio de Disciplinâ Sacramentorum or to the Holy Office in a public impediment, and to the Penitentiaria at the same time in a secret one, it is necessary that the latter should know of the public impediment and that recourse has been had to the competent Congregation). The supplica must also contain the causes set forth for granting the dispensation and other circumstances specified in the Propaganda Fide Instruction of 9 May 1877 (it is no longer necessary, either for the validity or liceity of the dispensation, to observe the paragraph relating to incestuous intercourse, even when probably this very thing had been alleged as the only reason for granting the dispensation). When there is question of consanguinity in the second degree bordering on the first, the supplica ought to be written by the bishop's own hand. He ought also to sign the declaration of poverty made by the petitioners when the dispensation is sought from the Penitentiaria in formâ pauperum; when he is in any way hindered from so doing he is bound to commission a priest to sign it in his name. A false declaration of poverty henceforth does not invalidate a dispensation in any case; but the authors of the false statement are bound in conscience to reimburse any amount unduly withheld (regulation for the Roman Curia of 12 June 1908). For further information on the many points already briefly described see the special canonical works, wherein are found all necessary directions as to what must be expressed so as to avoid nullity. When a supplica is affected (in a material point) by obreption or subreption it becomes necessary to ask for a so-called "reformatory decree" in case the favour asked has not yet been granted by the Curia, or for the letters known as "Perinde ac valere" if the favour has already been granted. If after all this a further material error is discovered, letters known as "Perinde ac valere super perinde ac valere" must be applied for.

Dispensation rescripts are generally drawn up in formâ commissâ mixtâ, i. e. they are entrusted to an executor who is thereby obliged to proceed to their execution, if he finds that the reasons are as alleged (si vera sint exposita). Canonists are divided as to whether rescripts in formâ commissâ mixtâ contain a favour granted from the moment of their being sent off, or to be granted when the execution actually takes place. Gasparri holds it as received practice that it suffices if the reasons alleged be actually true at the moment when the petition is presented. It is certain, however, that the executor required by Penitentiaria rescripts may safely fulfil his mission even if the pope should die before he had begun to execute it. The executor named for public impediments is usually the ordinary who forwards the supplica and for secret impediments an approved confessor chosen by the petitioner. Except when specially authorized, the person delegated cannot validly execute a dispensation before he has seen the original of the rescript. Therein it is usually prescribed that the reasons given by the petitioners must be verified. This verification, usually no longer a condition for valid execution, can be made, in the case of public impediments, extrajudicially or by subdelegation. In foro interno it can be made by the confessor in the very act of hearing the confessions of the parties. Should the inquiry disclose no substantial error, the executor proclaims the dispensation, i. e. he makes known, usually in writing, especially if he acts in foro externo, the decree which dispenses the petitioners; if the rescript authorizes him, he also legitimizes the children. Although the executor may subdelegate the preparatory acts, he may not, unless the rescript expressly says so, subdelegate the actual execution of the decree, unless he subdelegates to another ordinary. When the impediment is common to, and known to, both parties, execution ought to be made for both; wherefore, in a case in foro interno, the confessor of one of the parties hands over the rescript, after he has executed it, to the confessor of the other. The executor ought to observe with care the clauses enumerated in the decree, as some of them constitute conditions sine quâ non for the validity of the dispensation. As a rule, these clauses affecting validity may be recognized by the conditional conjunction or adverb of exclusion with which they begin (e. g. dummodo, "provided that"; et non aliter, "not otherwise"), or by an ablative absolute. When, however, a clause only prescribes a thing already of obligation by law it has merely the force of a reminder. In this matter also it is well to pay attention to the stylus curiœ, i. e. the legal diction of the Roman Congregations and Tribunals, and to consult authors of repute.

Causes for granting dispensations 
Following the principles laid down for dispensations in general, a matrimonial dispensation granted without sufficient cause, even by the pope himself, would be illicit; the more difficult and numerous the impediments the more serious must be the motives for removing them. An unjustified dispensation, even if granted by the pope, is null and void, in a case affecting the Divine law; and if granted by other bishops or superiors in cases affecting ordinary ecclesiastical law. Moreover, as it is not supposable that the pope wishes to act illicitly, it follows that if he has been moved by false allegations to grant a dispensation, even in a matter of ordinary ecclesiastical law, such dispensation is invalid. Hence the necessity of distinguishing in dispensations between motive or determining causes (causœ motivœ) and impulsive or merely influencing causes (causœ impulsivœ). Except when the information given is false, still more when he acts spontaneously (motu proprio) and "with certain knowledge", the presumption always is that a superior is acting from just motives. It may be remarked that if the pope refuses to grant a dispensation on a certain ground, an inferior prelate, properly authorized to dispense, may grant the dispensation in the same case on other grounds which in his judgment are sufficient. Canonists do not agree as to whether he can grant it on the identical ground by reason of his divergent appreciation of the latter's force.

Among the sufficient causes for matrimonial dispensations we may distinguish canonical causes, i. e. classified and held as sufficient by the common law and canonical jurisprudence, and reasonable causes, i. e. not provided for nominally in the law, but deserving of equitable consideration in view of circumstances or particular cases. An Instruction issued by Propaganda Fide (9 May 1877) enumerated sixteen canonical causes. The "Formulary of the Dataria" (Rome, 1901) gave twenty-eight, which suffice, either alone or concurrently with others, and act as a norm for all sufficient causes; they are: smallness of place or places; smallness of place coupled with the fact that outside it a sufficient dowry cannot be had; lack of dowry; insufficiency of dowry for the bride; a larger dowry; an increase of dowry by one-third; cessation of family feuds; preservation of peace; conclusion of peace between princes or states; avoidance of lawsuits over an inheritance, a dowry or some important business transaction; the fact that a fiancée is an orphan or has the care of a family; the age of the fiancée over twenty-four; the difficulty of finding another partner, owing to the fewness of male acquaintance, or the difficulty the latter experience in coming to her home; the hope of safeguarding the faith of a Catholic relation; the danger of a denominationally mixed marriage; the hope of converting a non-Catholic party; the keeping of property in a family; the preservation of an illustrious or honourable family; the excellence and merits of the parties; defamation to be avoided, or scandal prevented; intercourse already having taken place between the petitioners, or rape; the danger of a civil marriage; of marriage before a Protestant minister revalidation of a marriage that was null and void; finally, all reasonable causes judged such in the opinion of the pope (e. g. the public good), or special reasonable causes actuating the petitioners and made known to the pope, i. e. motives which, owing to the social status of the petitioners, it is opportune should remain unexplained out of respect for their reputation. These various causes have been stated in their briefest terms. To reach their exact force, some acquaintance is necessary with the stylus curiœ and the pertinent works of reputable authors, always avoiding exaggerated formalism. This list of causes is by no means exhaustive; the Holy See, in granting a dispensation, will consider any weighty circumstances that render the dispensation really justifiable.

Costs of dispensations 
The Council of Trent (Sess. XXIV, cap. v, De ref. matrim.) decreed that dispensations should be free of all charges. Diocesan chanceries are bound to conform to this law (many pontifical documents, and at times clauses in indults, remind them of it) and neither to exact nor accept anything but the modest contribution to the chancery expenses sanctioned by an Instruction approved by Innocent XI on 8 October 1678, and known as the Innocentian Tax (Taxa Innocentiana). Rosset holds that it is also lawful, when the diocese is poor, to demand payment of the expenses it incurs for dispensations. Sometimes the Holy See grants ampler freedom in this matter, but nearly always with the monition that all revenues from this source shall be employed for some good work, and not go to the diocesan curia as such. Henceforth every rescript requiring execution will state the sum which the diocesan curia is authorized to collect for its execution.

In the Roman Curia the expenses incurred by petitioners fall under four heads:
 expenses (expensœ) of carriage (postage, etc.), also a fee to the accredited agent, when one has been employed. This fee is fixed by the Congregation in question;
 a tax (taxa) to be used in defraying the expenses incurred by the Holy See in the organized administration of dispensations;
 the componendum, or eleemosynary (alms) fine to be paid to the Congregation and applied by it to pious uses;
 an alms imposed on the petitioners and to be distributed by themselves in good works.

The moneys paid under the first two heads do not affect, strictly speaking, the gratuity of the dispensation. They constitute a just compensation for the expenses the petitioners occasion the Curia. As for the alms and the componendum, besides the fact that they do not profit the pope nor the members of the Curia personally, but are employed in pious uses, they are justifiable, either as a fine for the faults which, as a rule, give occasion for the dispensation, or as a check to restrain a too great frequency of petitions often based on frivolous grounds. And if the Tridentine prohibition be still urged, it may be truly said that the pope has the right to abrogate the decrees of councils, and is the best judge of the reasons that legitimize such abrogation. The custom of tax and componendum is neither uniform nor universal in the Roman Curia.

Secular law equivalent
Dispensation is the canonical equivalent of license which, according to Black's Law Dictionary, is the authorisation to do something which would normally be illegal if the competent authority had not granted permission.

See also
Canon law of the Catholic Church
Casuistry
Derogation
Indulgence

References

Notes

Citations

Sources
David Chamber, Faculty Office Registers, 1534–1549: A Calendar of the First Two Registers of the Archbishop of Canterbury’s Faculty Office (Clarendon Press 1966)
Sir Edward Coke, 4th Institutes of the Laws of England 337 (Garland Publg. 1979)
Wilfrid Hooper, "The Court of Faculties", 25 English Historical Rev. 670 (1910)
Noel Cox, Dispensations, "Privileges, and the Conferment of Graduate Status: With Special Reference to Lambeth Degrees", Journal of Law and Religion, 18(1), 249–274 (2002–2003)
Gabriel Le Bras, Charles Lefebvre & Jacqueline Rambaud, "L’âge classique, 1140–1378: sources et théorie du droit" vol. 7, 487–532 (Sirey 1965)
Francis Oakley, "Jacobean Political Theology: The Absolute and Ordinary Powers of the King", 29 Journal of History of Ideas, 323 (1968)
Kenneth Pennington, The Prince and the Law, 1200–1600: Sovereignty and Rights in the Western Legal Tradition (U. Cal. Press 1993)

Bibliography
Black, Henry Campbell Black (and editors). Black's Law Dictionary (With Pronunciations), Fifth Edition (St. Paul Minn: West Publishing Co., 1979).
Häring, Bernard, C.SS.R. The Law of Christ, Volume I: General Moral Theology (Westminster, Maryland: The Newman Press, 1961) tr. by Edwin G. Kaiser, C.PP.S.
Metz, René. The Twentieth Century Encyclopedia of Catholicism, Vol. 80: What is Canon Law? (New York: Hawthorn Books, 1960) tr. by Michael Derrick.
 
1983 Code of Canon Law. The IntraText Digital Library
Catholic Encyclopedia. NewAdvent.org

. I. Dispensations in General: SUAREZ, De legibus (Naples, 1882), Bk. VI, x sqq., and Opera Omnia (Paris, 1856), VI; PYRRHUS CORRADIUS, Praxis dispensationum apostolicarum (Venice, 1699); KONINGS-PUTZER, Commentarium in facultates apostolicas (New York, 1898), pt. I; the commentators on the Decretals, especially SCHMALZGRUEBER, Jus ecclesiasticum universale (Rome, 1843), Bk. I. tit. ii; WERNZ, Jus decretalium (Rome, 1905), I, tit. iv, 138; VON SCHERER, Handbuch des Kirchenrechts (Graz, 1898), I, 172; HINSCHIUS. System d. kath. Kirchenr. (Berlin, 1869), I. 744, 789; the moral theologies, under the treatise De legibus, particularly ST. ALPHONSUS LIGUORI, Theologia Moralis (Rome, 1905), I, iv, Dub. 4; D'ANNIBALE, Summula Theologiœ Moralis (Rome, 1908), I, tr. iii, 220; BALLERINI, Opus Morale (Prato, 1889), I, 363; OJETTI, Synopsis rerum moralium et juris pontificii (Rome, 1904), s. v. Dispensatio; THOMASSIN, Ancienne et nouvelle discipline de l'Eglise touchant les bénéfices (Paris, 1725), II, p. II, 1, 3, xxiv-xxix; STIEGLER, Dispensation, Dispensationwesen, und Dispensationsrecht in his Kirchenrecht (Mainz, 1901). I, and in Archiv f. kath. Kirchenr., LXXVII, 3; FIEBAG, De indole ac virtute dispensationum secundum principia jur. canonici (Breslau, 1867).II. Matrimonial Dispensations: PYRRHUS CORRADIUS, op. cit.; DE JUSTIS, De dispens. matrim. (Venice, 1769); GIOVINE, De dispens. matrim. (Naples, 1863); PLANCHARD, Dispenses matrim. (Angoulème, 1882); FEIJE, De imped. et dispens. matrim. (Louvain, 1885); ZITELLI, De dispens. matrim. (Rome, 1887); VAN DE BURGT, De dispens. matrim. (Bois-le-Duc, 1865); POMPEN, De dispens. et revalidatione matrim. (Amsterdam, 1897); ROUSSET, De sacramento matrimonii (Saint-Jean de Maurienne, 1895), IV, 231; KONINGS-PUTZER, Op. cit., 174 sqq., 376 sqq.; SANCHEZ, De s. matrimonii sacramento (Viterbo, 1739), Bk. VIII; GASPARRI, Tract. canonicus de matrimonio (Paris, 1892), I, iv, 186; MANSELLA, De imped. matrim. (Rome, 1881), 162; LEITNER, Lehrb. des kath. Eherechts (Paderborn, 1902), 401; SCHNITZER, Kath. Eherecht (Freiburg, 1898), 496; SANTILEITNER, Prœlectiones juris canonici (Ratisbon, 1899), IV, appendix I; WERNZ, Jus Decretalium (Rome, 1908), IV, tit. xxix FREISEN Geschichte des kanon. Eherechts bis zum Verfall der Glossenlitteratur (Tübingen, 1888), and in Archiv für kath. Kirchenr., LXXVII, 3 sqq., and LXXVIII, 91; ESMEIN, Le mariage en droit canonique (Paris, 1891), II, 315; ZHISMAN, Das Eherecht der orient. Kirche (Vienna, 1864), 190, 712.

Jurisprudence of Catholic canon law
Holy See
Catholic matrimonial canon law
Catholic Church legal terminology